Calophyllum havilandii is a species of flowering plant in the Calophyllaceae family. It is endemic to Borneo, where it grows in peat swamps.

References

havilandii
Endemic flora of Borneo
Vulnerable plants
Taxonomy articles created by Polbot